Danske Privathospitaler is a private Danish hospital. It was created out of mergers with Esbjerg Privathospital, Frederiksborg klinikken and Privathospitalet Dalgas on 1 January 2007.

Danske Privathospitaler is the first private hospital to become national in Denmark.

References

Hospitals in Denmark
Hospitals established in 2007